The Worlds of Robert A. Heinlein is a collection of science fiction short stories by American writer Robert A. Heinlein, published in 1966.

It includes an introduction entitled "Pandora's Box" that describes some of the difficulties in making predictions about the near future. Heinlein outlines some of his predictions that he made in 1949 (published 1952) and examines how well they stood up to about 15 years of progress in 1965. The prediction was originally published in Galaxy magazine, February 1952, Vol. 3, No. 5, under the title "Where to?" (pp. 13–22).

Following the introduction are five short stories:
 "Free Men" (written c. 1947, but first published in this collection, 1966)
 "Blowups Happen" (1940)
 "Searchlight" (1962)
 "Life-Line" (1939)
 "Solution Unsatisfactory" (1940)

In 1980, the entire contents of this collection, with an updated version of "Pandora's Box", were included in Heinlein's collection Expanded Universe.

External links
 

1966 short story collections
Short story collections by Robert A. Heinlein
Ace Books books